Maik Łukowicz (born 1 February 1995) is a professional footballer who plays for German team Teutonia Ottensen as a forward. Born in Germany, he represented Poland at under-17 and under-20 levels.

Club career
Born in Bremen, Germany, he began his career in the youth teams of his hometown club SV Werder Bremen, making his debut in their reserves on 25 April 2014 in a 1–2 home defeat to the reserves of Hannover 96 in the Regionalliga Nord.

The following season, he scored 13 goals in 32 games as they achieved promotion to the 3. Liga. In their 2–2 draw at VfB Lübeck on 26 September 2014, he was accused of doing a Hitler salute, which is a criminal offence in Germany; he was cleared of this accusation by a court the following January. On 23 November 2014, he scored a hat-trick in a 4–3 win over the reserves of Eintracht Braunschweig. After the winter break, he did not net any goals until a 7–0 win against FT Braunschweig on 17 May 2015.

On 28 August 2015, soon after beginning the 3. Liga campaign for Bremen II, Łukowicz was loaned to F.C. Hansa Rostock for the remainder of the season.

In August 2016, Łukowicz transferred to the reserve side of Eintracht Braunschweig, playing in the fourth tier Regionalliga Nord

In August 2018, following Braunschweig II's relegation from the Regionalliga Nord, he remained in the division joining VfB Oldenburg.

On 9 August 2022, Łukowicz joined Teutonia Ottensen, also of the Regionalliga Nord.

International career
Born in Germany, Łukowicz also holds a Polish passport. He represented the Poland under-20 team as they won the 2014–15 Four Nations tournament, concluding with a 2–1 win over Germany in Jena.

References

External links

1996 births
Living people
Footballers from Bremen
German people of Polish descent
Polish people of German descent
Citizens of Poland through descent
German footballers
Polish footballers
Poland youth international footballers
Association football forwards
SV Werder Bremen II players
FC Hansa Rostock players
Eintracht Braunschweig II players
VfB Oldenburg players
FC Teutonia Ottensen players
3. Liga players
Regionalliga players